Manji may refer to:
 Sikh Manji, a religious administrative unit in Sikhism
 The Japanese name of the 卍 character (from Chinese: wàn zì)
 Manji (era), a Japanese era name
 A type of sai (weapon), a traditional Okinawan weapon
 The alternative term for a charpai
 Manji (蠻子), an old term for Southern China

Arts and entertainment 
 Manji (raga), one of the Ragams of Carnatic music
 Manji, the original Japanese title of the 1928 novel Quicksand by Jun'ichirō Tanizaki
 Manji (film), the title of several film adaptations of the novel

People 
 Irshad Manji (born 1968), Canadian author
 Firoze Manji (born 1950), Kenyan activist, author and CEO
 Hafeez Manji (born 1987), Kenyan cricketer
 Manji Khan (1888–1937), Hindustani Classical vocalist of the Jaipur-Atrauli Gharana
 Manji Terashima (1898–1983), Japanese photographer
 Manji Fukushima, Japanese table tennis player
 Raf Manji (born 1966), a New Zealand politician

Popular culture 
 Manji, level 3 from quest 1 of the video game The Legend of Zelda
 Manji Clan, Yoshimitsu's clan in the Tekken series of video games
 Manji Cult, appeared in the 1998 PS1 video game Tenchu: Stealth Assassins
 Manji, an organization in the Soulcalibur game series
 Manji, a character in the role-playing game MapleStory
 Manji, the main character of the manga series Blade of the Immortal by Hiroaki Samura
 Tokyo Manji Gang, the main group from the manga series Tokyo Revengers by Ken Wakui

See also 
 Manj (disambiguation)
 Manjhi (disambiguation)
 Mangi (disambiguation)
 Manzi (disambiguation)
 Mangi Dam (disambiguation)